Phalaenophana pyramusalis, the dark-banded owlet, is a moth of the family Erebidae. The species was first described by Francis Walker in 1859. It is found in North America from Saskatchewan to Nova Scotia, south to North Carolina and Texas.

The wingspan is 21–25 mm. Adults are on wing from June to July in Alberta. There are two or more generations per year.

The larvae feed on dead leaves. They prefer leaves that are moist, blackened and in decay.

References

Herminiinae
Moths of North America
Moths described in 1859